The 1st constituency of the Aveyron is a French legislative constituency in the Aveyron département.

Deputies

Election results

2022

 
 
 
 
 
 
 
|-
| colspan="8" bgcolor="#E9E9E9"|
|-

2017

2012

|- style="background-color:#E9E9E9;text-align:center;"
! colspan="2" rowspan="2" style="text-align:left;" | Candidate
! rowspan="2" colspan="2" style="text-align:left;" | Party
! colspan="2" | 1st round
! colspan="2" | 2nd round
|- style="background-color:#E9E9E9;text-align:center;"
! width="75" | Votes
! width="30" | %
! width="75" | Votes
! width="30" | %
|-
| style="background-color:" |
| style="text-align:left;" | Yves Censi
| style="text-align:left;" | Union for a Popular Movement
| UMP
| 
| 39.83%
| 
| 50.67%
|-
| style="background-color:" |
| style="text-align:left;" | Monique Bultel-Herment
| style="text-align:left;" | Socialist Party
| PS
| 
| 28.27%
| 
| 49.33%
|-
| style="background-color:" |
| style="text-align:left;" | Stéphane Mazars
| style="text-align:left;" | Radical Party of the Left
| PRG
| 
| 14.18%
| colspan="2" style="text-align:left;" |
|-
| style="background-color:" |
| style="text-align:left;" | Jean-Guillaume Remise
| style="text-align:left;" | National Front
| FN
| 
| 8.16%
| colspan="2" style="text-align:left;" |
|-
| style="background-color:" |
| style="text-align:left;" | Guilhem Serieys
| style="text-align:left;" | Left Front
| FG
| 
| 5.54%
| colspan="2" style="text-align:left;" |
|-
| style="background-color:" |
| style="text-align:left;" | Bruno Berardi
| style="text-align:left;" | The Greens
| VEC
| 
| 3.02%
| colspan="2" style="text-align:left;" |
|-
| style="background-color:" |
| style="text-align:left;" | Marie-Line Faixa
| style="text-align:left;" | Ecologist
| ECO
| 
| 0.69%
| colspan="2" style="text-align:left;" |
|-
| style="background-color:" |
| style="text-align:left;" | Arlette Saint-Avit
| style="text-align:left;" | Far Left
| EXG
| 
| 0.32%
| colspan="2" style="text-align:left;" |
|-
| colspan="8" style="background-color:#E9E9E9;"|
|- style="font-weight:bold"
| colspan="4" style="text-align:left;" | Total
| 
| 100%
| 
| 100%
|-
| colspan="8" style="background-color:#E9E9E9;"|
|-
| colspan="4" style="text-align:left;" | Registered voters
| 
| style="background-color:#E9E9E9;"|
| 
| style="background-color:#E9E9E9;"|
|-
| colspan="4" style="text-align:left;" | Blank/Void ballots
| 
| 1.75%
| 
| 3.32%
|-
| colspan="4" style="text-align:left;" | Turnout
| 
| 66.00%
| 
| 65.77%
|-
| colspan="4" style="text-align:left;" | Abstentions
| 
| 34.00%
| 
| 34.23%
|-
| colspan="8" style="background-color:#E9E9E9;"|
|- style="font-weight:bold"
| colspan="6" style="text-align:left;" | Result
| colspan="2" style="background-color:" | UMP HOLD
|}

2007

|- style="background-color:#E9E9E9;text-align:center;"
! colspan="2" rowspan="2" style="text-align:left;" | Candidate
! rowspan="2" colspan="2" style="text-align:left;" | Party
! colspan="2" | 1st round
! colspan="2" | 2nd round
|- style="background-color:#E9E9E9;text-align:center;"
! width="75" | Votes
! width="30" | %
! width="75" | Votes
! width="30" | %
|-
| style="background-color:" |
| style="text-align:left;" | Yves Censi
| style="text-align:left;" | Union for a Popular Movement
| UMP
| 
| 35.15%
| 
| 53.31%
|-
| style="background-color:" |
| style="text-align:left;" | Christian Teyssedre
| style="text-align:left;" | Socialist Party
| PS
| 
| 29.08%
| 
| 46.69%
|-
| style="background-color:" |
| style="text-align:left;" | Thierry Puech
| style="text-align:left;" | Majorité Présidentielle
| 
| 
| 13.19%
| colspan="2" style="text-align:left;" |
|-
| style="background-color:" |
| style="text-align:left;" | Maïté Laur
| style="text-align:left;" | Democratic Movement
| MoDem
| 
| 11.14%
| colspan="2" style="text-align:left;" |
|-
| style="background-color:" |
| style="text-align:left;" | Marie-Claude Carlin
| style="text-align:left;" | The Greens
| VEC
| 
| 2.74%
| colspan="2" style="text-align:left;" |
|-
| style="background-color:" |
| style="text-align:left;" | Jean-Léon Miquel
| style="text-align:left;" | National Front
| FN
| 
| 1.97%
| colspan="2" style="text-align:left;" |
|-
| style="background-color:" |
| style="text-align:left;" | Marie-Cécile Perillat
| style="text-align:left;" | Far Left
| EXG
| 
| 1.89%
| colspan="2" style="text-align:left;" |
|-
| style="background-color:" |
| style="text-align:left;" | Sylvie Foulquier
| style="text-align:left;" | Communist
| COM
| 
| 1.50%
| colspan="2" style="text-align:left;" |
|-
| style="background-color:" |
| style="text-align:left;" | Jean-Robert Evesque
| style="text-align:left;" | Hunting, Fishing, Nature, Traditions
| CPNT
| 
| 1.29%
| colspan="2" style="text-align:left;" |
|-
| style="background-color:" |
| style="text-align:left;" | Claire-Marie Garboulin
| style="text-align:left;" | Ecologist
| ECO
| 
| 0.78%
| colspan="2" style="text-align:left;" |
|-
| style="background-color:" |
| style="text-align:left;" | Ingrid Lebeau
| style="text-align:left;" | Divers
| DIV
| 
| 0.57%
| colspan="2" style="text-align:left;" |
|-
| style="background-color:" |
| style="text-align:left;" | Arlette Saint-Avit
| style="text-align:left;" | Far Left
| EXG
| 
| 0.44%
| colspan="2" style="text-align:left;" |
|-
| style="background-color:" |
| style="text-align:left;" | Nicolle le Marchand
| style="text-align:left;" | Far Right
| EXD
| 
| 0.26%
| colspan="2" style="text-align:left;" |
|-
| colspan="8" style="background-color:#E9E9E9;"|
|- style="font-weight:bold"
| colspan="4" style="text-align:left;" | Total
| 
| 100%
| 
| 100%
|-
| colspan="8" style="background-color:#E9E9E9;"|
|-
| colspan="4" style="text-align:left;" | Registered voters
| 
| style="background-color:#E9E9E9;"|
| 
| style="background-color:#E9E9E9;"|
|-
| colspan="4" style="text-align:left;" | Blank/Void ballots
| 
| 2.40%
| 
| 3.57%
|-
| colspan="4" style="text-align:left;" | Turnout
| 
| 68.05%
| 
| 68.02%
|-
| colspan="4" style="text-align:left;" | Abstentions
| 
| 31.95%
| 
| 31.98%
|-
| colspan="8" style="background-color:#E9E9E9;"|
|- style="font-weight:bold"
| colspan="6" style="text-align:left;" | Result
| colspan="2" style="background-color:" | UMP HOLD
|}

2002

 
 
 
 
 
 
 
 
 
|-
| colspan="8" bgcolor="#E9E9E9"|
|-

1997

 
 
 
 
 
 
 
|-
| colspan="8" bgcolor="#E9E9E9"|
|-

References

Sources
 Official results of French elections from 1998: 

 French Interior Ministry results website: 

1